Hjalmar Petersen (January 2, 1890March 29, 1968) was an American politician who served as the 23rd Governor of Minnesota.

Background
Hjalmar Petersen was born in Eskildstrup, Denmark to Lauritz and Anna Petersen, who moved with Hjalmar to Chicago, Illinois shortly after his birth. They later moved to the Danebod in Tyler, Minnesota. Petersen attended school until the seventh grade. His career in journalism, which had begun in 1904, culminated in his purchase in 1914 of the Askov American in Askov, Minnesota, a weekly newspaper he owned for the rest of his life.

Political career
After serving as Askov's village clerk and mayor, Petersen won two terms in the Minnesota House of Representatives, where he sponsored the state income-tax law and urged that tax revenues be spent on public education. Before he ran for the Minnesota Legislature he had been a member of the Republican Party. By the time he ran for office he was a member of the Farmer-Labor Party. He served in the legislature from 1931 to 1934, representing the old House District 56.

Petersen was elected the 28th Lieutenant Governor of Minnesota in 1934 and served with Governor Floyd B. Olson. He was sworn in as governor two days after Olson died of cancer on August 22, 1936. He served the remainder of Olson's term but declined to run for governor himself in the November general election, opting instead to launch a successful bid for Railroad and Warehouse Commissioner, a position he then assumed after leaving the governorship on January 4, 1937. He later ran for governor in 1940 and 1942, losing both times to Harold Stassen.

Personal life
After his term as governor, he served as the president of the American Publishing Company. He was married twice, first to Rigmor C. Wosgaard in 1914 and later to Medora Grandprey in 1934. 
He died in 1968 in Columbus, Ohio.

See also
List of U.S. state governors born outside the United States

References

Other resources
 The   Hjalmar Petersen Papers are available for research use at the Minnesota Historical Society.

Further reading
Keillor, Steven J. Hjalmar Petersen of Minnesota: The Politics of Provincial Independence  ( Minnesota Historical Society Press. 1987)

1890 births
1968 deaths
American Lutherans
Governors of Minnesota
Members of the Minnesota House of Representatives
Lieutenant Governors of Minnesota
Danish emigrants to the United States
Democratic Party governors of Minnesota
Mayors of places in Minnesota
Minnesota Farmer–Laborites
Farmer–Labor Party state governors of the United States
20th-century American politicians
Minnesota Republicans
20th-century Lutherans